The natural resource consumption tax is a kind of tax which is aimed to help ensure long run sustainability by increasing awareness of natural resource consumption.

International water
The popular conception of international waters is that there is no owner of them, so anyone can take advantage of them. Some propose that instead international waters are to be seen as owned by all the people of the planet. Hence, any particular person exploiting the natural resources of international waters should be taxed by the United Nations, any proxy of it, or some other international agency.

Sovereignty territory
At present, property laws govern this issue. Natural resources are bound to the land and offshore natural resources are deemed to be owned by the state. Generally speaking, there is no tax on the consumption of natural resources. It might be difficult to implement such a tax.

Stumpage System
The stumpage fee can also be deemed as a kind of natural resources consumption tax.

See also
 Consumption tax
 Ecotax
 Land value tax
 Severance tax
 Tax shift

Environmental tax